Shaanxi Wuzhou Football Club was a Chinese professional football club based in Xi'an, Shaanxi which last played in the China League One division.

The club was originally formed on February 5, 2007 as Guangdong Sunray Cave F.C. and was once owned by Guangdong Sports Bureau and Sunray Cave Group. In November 2014, a group of local companies from Shaanxi Province collectively acquired the full ownership of the club and subsequently renamed it to Shaanxi Wuzhou F.C., following the club's relocation 
to the Shaanxi Province Stadium in Xi'an. However, the club failed to settle the wages of the players for 2014 season and was forbidden to play in the Chinese football league system by Chinese Football Association.

History
The Sunray Cave Group who had previously owned Guangzhou F.C. and the third-tier football club Guangzhou Sunray Cave Easter founded Guangdong Sunray Cave Football Club on February 5, 2007 with the Guangdong Sports Bureau to take part in the third tier of Chinese football with a team predominantly built from the Guangdong youth team. In the club's debut season Cao Yang was brought in as their manager while the team played in the 8,000 seater Nanhai District Stadium in Foshan, Guangdong. Playing in an orange top, black shorts and orange socks for their home kits and an all white outfit for the away kits the team finished bottom within their group at the end at the end of the 2007 league season. The following 2008 league campaign saw the team move into the 36,686 seater Century Lotus Stadium in Foshan where they matured into genuine division championship contenders and came runners-up within the league, winning promotion to the second tier.

The club's debut season in the second division saw them move into the 12,000 capacity Huangpu Sports Center in Huangpu District, Guangzhou and they ended the campaign in a respectable fifth. The following season saw the owners wanting to move into the 15,000 capacity Guangdong Provincial People's Stadium, however it was going through renovation and the team had to use the Dongguan Stadium, Huangpu Sports Center and University of Technology Stadium before they finally moved in. With the team settled in results significantly improved within the 2011 campaign with the club looking like genuine promotion contenders until on September 24, 2011 they lost a league against Shenyang Dongjin 3–2 and the club were unable to recover for the final run in for promotion. After the club's failed promotion attempt Dragan Kokotović was brought in to provide more experience, however he left on March 27, 2012 after only several games and Cao was brought back as a caretaker manager. On July 29, 2012 José Ricardo Rambo came in as permanent manager while Cao became General manager. José time as manager was not a success and Guangdong became embroiled in a relegation battle, which saw the chairman Lin Qin bring back Cao once again on August 30, 2012 as a caretaker manager and relegate José as his assistant for the rest of the 2012 league campaign.

On 14 December 2014, a group of local companies from Shaanxi Province collectively acquired the full ownership of the club and subsequently renamed it to Shaanxi Wuzhou F.C. However, the club failed to register for the 2015 league season due to wage arrears. On 31 January 2015, the club was forbidden to play in the Chinese football league system by Chinese Football Association, and was dissolved soon after.

Name changes
2007–2014: Guangdong Sunray Cave
2015: Shaanxi Wuzhou

Kit colours

Honours
League Level 2
National 2nd Runners-up (3): 2011
National 2nd Runners-up (3): 2013

League Level 3
Southern Champions (1): 2008
National Runners-up (2): 2008

Results
All-time League Rankings

As of the end of 2014 season.

 In southern group  Had to use several other stadiums: see Home Stadiums

Key
<div>

 Pld = Played
 W = Games won
 D = Games drawn
 L = Games lost
 F = Goals for
 A = Goals against
 Pts = Points
 Pos = Final position

 DNQ = Did not qualify
 DNE = Did not enter
 NH = Not Held
- = Does Not Exist
 R1 = Round 1
 R2 = Round 2
 R3 = Round 3
 R4 = Round 4

 F = Final
 SF = Semi-finals
 QF = Quarter-finals
 R16 = Round of 16
 Group = Group stage
 GS2 = Second Group stage
 QR1 = First Qualifying Round
 QR2 = Second Qualifying Round
 QR3 = Third Qualifying Round

Managerial history
  Cao Yang (February 5, 2007 – January 1, 2012)
  Dragan Kokotović (January 5, 2012 – March 27, 2012)
  Cao Yang (interim) (March 27, 2012–28 July 2012)
  José Ricardo Rambo (July 29, 2012 – August 30, 2012)
  Cao Yang (interim) (30 August 2012 – January 3, 2013)
  Zhang Jun (January 3, 2013 – January 2, 2014)
  Julio César Moreno (January 2, 2014 – April 20, 2014)
  Feng Feng (interim) (April 20, 2014 – May 13, 2014)
  Mai Chao (May 13, 2014 – November 2014)
  Alejandro Menéndez (December 28, 2014 – 2015)

Past and present Internationals
Names in bold indicate players who had international cap when played for Guangdong Sunray Cave F.C.
Bosnia and Herzegovina
 Petar Jelić (2014)
China PR
 Ye Weichao (2007–10, 2014)
Costa Rica
 Darío Delgado (2011)
Hong Kong
 Chan Siu Ki (2012–13)
 Leung Chun Pong (2012–13)
Mali
 Mourtala Diakité (2011)
Uruguay
 Carlos Andrés García (2013–14)
Brazil
 Joel Bertoti Padilha (2009–10)

References

External links
Club website 
The Sunray Cave Group website 
Supporters' site 1 
Supporters' site 2 

 
Association football clubs established in 2007
Association football clubs disestablished in 2015
Sport in Shaanxi
Football clubs in Guangzhou
Football clubs in Guangdong
2007 establishments in China
2015 disestablishments in China
Defunct football clubs in China